Kulbhushan Kharbanda (born 21 October 1944) is an Indian actor who works in Hindi and Punjabi films. He is best known for his role as the antagonist Shakaal in Shaan (1980), Starting off with the Delhi-based theatre group 'Yatrik' in the 1960s, he moved to films with Sai Paranjpye's Jadu Ka Shankh in 1974. He worked in several parallel cinema films before working in the mainstream Hindi film industry. He appeared in Mahesh Bhatt's classic Arth (1982), Ek Chadar Maili Si (1986), Waaris (1988), and in all three parts of Deepa Mehta's Elements trilogy: Fire (1996), Earth (1998), and Water (2005). After nearly two decades he was seen on the theatre stage at the Padatik Theatre in Kolkata in the production of Atmakatha, directed by Vinay Sharma.

Personal life
Kharbanda is married to Maheshwari, a woman who was previously married to the Maharaja of Kotah. Born the daughter of Maharaja Ram Singh II of Pratapgarh, Rajasthan, Maheshwari married Kharbanda in 1965.

Career
After his studies he and a few of his college friends formed a theatre group called "Abhiyaan", and then joined Delhi-based "Yatrik", a bilingual theatre repertory founded by director Joy Michael in 1964; he became its first paid artiste, though after a few years Yatrik collapsed as the director was lecturing in US universities. That is when he moved to Kolkata in 1972 and started working with the theatre group "Padatik" which did Hindi theatre, under director Shyamanand Jalan. Here he worked for a while before moving on to Mumbai and films.

He first got noticed in Nishaant (1974) by Shyam Benegal, with whom he went on to work in several more films including Manthan (1976), Bhumika: The Role (1977), Junoon (1978), and Kalyug (1980). Soon he was a regular with parallel cinema directors, like in Godhuli (1977) with B. V. Karanth.

Playing the bald villain Shakaal in Shaan (1980) directed by Ramesh Sippy, he saw his transition into Bollywood mainstream. Kharbanda went on to appear in Shakti (1982), Ghayal (1990), Jo Jeeta Wohi Sikandar (1992), Gupt (1997), Border (1997), Yes Boss (1997) and Refugee (2000). However, he continued appearing in art films such as Chakra (1981), with Smita Patil and Naseeruddin Shah, Arth (1982), with Shabana Azmi, Andhi Gali (1984), the first Hindi film of Buddhadeb Dasgupta, Ek Chadar Maili Si (1986), with Hema Malini, Utsav (1984), by Girish Karnad, Mandi (1983), Trikal (1985), Susman (1987), by Shyam Benegal, Naseem (1995), by Saeed Akhtar Mirza and Monsoon Wedding (2001) directed by Mira Nair.

He portrayed Reema Lagoo's husband and Raj Babbar's brother in Shashi Kapoor's Filmwalas Productions' Kalyug. He has also appeared in period pieces such as Jodha Akbar and Lagaan. His most recent films are Aloo Chaat and Team: The Force. He has acted in a number of Punjabi films. He portrayed the hero in the legendary film Chan Pardesi (1980) and starred in the Punjabi comedy Mahaul Theek Hai (1999).

He has acted in six of Deepa Mehta's movies and all her trilogy films: Earth, Fire and Water. He did a German film in 2009.

He has acted in TV serials, such as Shanno Ki Shaadi and Mahi Ve.

He has been seen on the stage in plays such as Teen Farishtay, Hatya ek akaar ki, Baki Itihaas, Ek Shunya Bajirao, Guinea Pig, Girdhade, Sakharam Binder and, recently, Atmakatha.

Currently, he has been seen on various digital platforms such as Amazon Prime's Mirzapur And Mirzapur 2 in which his character of Satyanand Tripathi aka Bauji has garned appreciation worldwide and the series too has been successfully running from two seasons and the third season is in pre-production and shooting will go on floors soon due to massive demand and fan following.

Filmography

Television

|-
|Kulbhushan Kharbanda as Hakim Tarachand aka Mamaji Khandaani Shafakhana 2019

Films

Awards and nominations

References

External links

Further reading
 A stage of reflection Interview in The Hindu

1944 births
Living people
People from Attock District
Punjabi people
Male actors in Hindi cinema
Indian male stage actors
Hindi theatre
Indian male television actors
Male actors in Punjabi cinema
Delhi University alumni
Aligarh Muslim University alumni